Laurence Clifford Hullena (born 24 August 1965) is a former New Zealand rugby union player. A prop, Hullena represented Wellington and North Harbour at a provincial level, and was a member of the New Zealand national side, the All Blacks, from 1990 to 1991. He played nine matches for the All Blacks but did not play any internationals.

References

1965 births
Living people
Rugby union players from Masterton
People educated at Wairarapa College
New Zealand rugby union players
New Zealand international rugby union players
Rugby union props
Wellington rugby union players
North Harbour rugby union players